The Trajan was a  74-gun ship of the line of the French Navy.

In 1793, Trajan was commissioned in Lorient, under captain Villaret de Joyeuse.

In 1797, she took part in the Expédition d'Irlande, an ill-fated attempt to invade Ireland. On 17 December 1797, she was renamed Gaulois.

She was eventually broken up in 1805.

External links 
 Ships of the line

Ships of the line of the French Navy
Téméraire-class ships of the line
1792 ships